Big Dry Creek may refer to:

Big Dry Creek (Littleton, Colorado), a tributary of the South Platte River
Big Dry Creek (Westminster, Colorado), a tributary of the South Platte River